Gerardo Sosa Castelán (born 26 July 1955) is a Mexican lawyer and politician from the Institutional Revolutionary Party. He has served as Deputy of the LVIII and LX Legislatures of the Mexican Congress representing Hidalgo. He previously served in the Congress of Hidalgo from 1981 to 1984.

References

1955 births
Living people
Politicians from Hidalgo (state)
Institutional Revolutionary Party politicians
21st-century Mexican politicians
Universidad Autónoma del Estado de Hidalgo alumni
20th-century Mexican politicians
Members of the Congress of Hidalgo
Deputies of the LX Legislature of Mexico
Members of the Chamber of Deputies (Mexico) for Hidalgo (state)